Marija Anzulovic (born ) is a former Croatian female volleyball player. She was part of the Croatia women's national volleyball team.

She competed with the national team at the 2000 Summer Olympics in Sydney, Australia, finishing 7th.

See also
 Croatia at the 2000 Summer Olympics

References

External links
 Sport Reference profile
 http://www.bvbinfo.com/player.asp?ID=8850
 http://www.cev.lu/CoachDetails.aspx?TeamID=9865&CoachID=64847
 http://www.todor66.com/volleyball/Olympics/Women_2000.html

1968 births
Living people
Croatian women's volleyball players
Sportspeople from Split, Croatia
Volleyball players at the 2000 Summer Olympics
Olympic volleyball players of Croatia